Anatoliy Vasylyovych Korobochka (born 5 January 1955 in Simferopol, USSR, now Ukraine) is a former midfielder, and was formerly the Director of Football at Heart of Midlothian football club in Scotland.

Korobochka has played for Tavriya Simferopol, CSKA Moscow, SKA Odessa, and numerous clubs in GDR. After retiring from playing in 1991 he moved into coaching with CSKA Moscow, coaching their reserve team. Afterwards he became head of player development for them. In 1998, he became head-coach of Tavriya Simferopol. This was followed by brief spells with Spartak-Chukotka and FC Reutov, where was also a general director. Over the years he held the administrator position at CSKA Moscow and Torpedo Moscow.

Korobochka arrived at Heart of Midlothian in 2006 as Director of Football along with Sport Director Alex Koslovski and Eduard Malofeev, the consultant who himself had an unsuccessful six-game spell as interim head coach in October 2006.

On 30 July 2007 it was confirmed that Korobochka would take permanent charge of Hearts for the 2007–08 season, joint with Stephen Frail who had acted as Interim assistant coach the previous season. Their reign ended on 1 January 2008 following five consecutive defeats. Frail became caretaker manager, whilst Korobochka retained his position as Director of Football. On 22 July 2009 Hearts announced he had left this position. After that, he managed FC Gornyak Uchaly.

Managerial stats

References

External links

Living people
Soviet football managers
Soviet footballers
Russian footballers
PFC CSKA Moscow players
Heart of Midlothian F.C. managers
SC Tavriya Simferopol players
Expatriate football managers in Scotland
Scottish Premier League managers
1955 births
Ukrainian Premier League managers
SC Tavriya Simferopol managers
Sportspeople from Simferopol
FC Gornyak Uchaly managers
Expatriate football managers in Russia
Association football midfielders